This is a partial discography of The Barber of Seville, an opera by Gioachino Rossini. The work was first performed on 20 February 1816, at the Teatro Argentina in Rome.

Audio recordings

Video recordings

References
Notes

Sources
 Burton D. Fisher's The Barber of Seville (Opera Classics Library Series)

Opera discographies
Operas by Gioachino Rossini